Jameh Mosque of Shafei is located in the city of Kermanshah, which is located on the Bazaar of Kermanshah.

Sources 

Mosques in Iran
Mosque buildings with domes
National works of Iran
Shafi'i